Sierra Hyland (born March 3, 1995)  is a former collegiate right handed softball pitcher. She played for Team Mexico and helped them place fourth at the 2020 Tokyo Olympics.

Early life
Born in Merriam, Kansas, she grew up in Visalia, California and played for El Diamante High School.

Playing career
She graduated from the Cal Poly.   

She played for the Cleveland Comets.

References 

1995 births
Living people
American sportspeople of Mexican descent
Cal Poly Mustangs softball players
Cleveland Comets players
Competitors at the 2022 World Games
Mexican softball players
Olympic softball players of Mexico
People from Shawnee, Kansas
Softball players at the 2020 Summer Olympics
Softball players from California
Softball players from Kansas
Sportspeople from Visalia, California